Flying J Ranch Airport  is a privately owned, public use non-towered airport owned by Howard E. Jenkins.

Although most U.S. airports use the same three-letter location identifier for the FAA, IATA, and ICAO this airport is only assigned  E37 by the FAA.

Facilities and aircraft 
According to the FAA the airport has two dirt runways:
 18/36 measuring 
 7/25 measuring 

The runways are described as being "extremely rough, rutted [with] large rocks scattered on surface".

For the 12-month period ending April 15, 2015, the airport had 200 aircraft operations, an average of 0.6 per day: 100% general aviation. At that time there were 8 aircraft based at this airport: 75% single-engine, no ultralight, 25% multi-engine, no jet, and no helicopters.

References

External links 
 

Airports in Graham County, Arizona